Irki  is a settlement in the administrative district of Gmina Koszęcin, within Lubliniec County, Silesian Voivodeship, in southern Poland.

The settlement has a population of 37.

References

Irki